Hanggang Kailan (International title: Circle of Hearts / ) is a 2004 Philippine television drama romance series broadcast by GMA Network. Directed by Jose Javier Reyes and Mark A. Reyes, it stars Lorna Tolentino, Christopher de Leon and Alice Dixson. It premiered on March 8, 2004 on the network's Telebabad line up replacing Narito ang Puso Ko. The series concluded on July 30, 2004 with a total of 95 episodes. It was replaced by Mulawin in its timeslot.

Cast and characters

Lead cast
 Lorna Tolentino as Valerie Rosales
 Christopher de Leon as Diosdado "Dado" Villarama
 Alice Dixson as Thelma Villarama

Supporting cast
 Ogie Alcasid as George
 Aiza Seguerra as Gina
 Ana Capri as Lulu
 Nancy Castiglione as Tara Rosales
 Maxene Magalona as Angela Villarama
 Alessandra De Rossi as Jennifer Villarama
 Jake Cuenca as Warren Rosales
 Paolo Contis as Dennis Carbonel

Recurring cast
 Sid Lucero as Eugene
 Janus Del Prado as Lito
 Boy 2 Quizon as Obet
 Girlie Sevilla as Marlyn
 Janice de Belen as Elizabeth
 Ricardo Cepeda as Jefferson
 Mark Gil as Roberto
 Gandong Cervantes as Victor
 Neil Ryan Sese as Edwin
 Cristine Reyes as Hana
 Jessy Mendiola as Gina

References

External links
 

2004 Philippine television series debuts
2004 Philippine television series endings
Filipino-language television shows
GMA Network drama series
Philippine romance television series
Television shows set in the Philippines